Álvaro González may refer to:
Álvaro González (footballer, born 1973), Uruguyan football forward
Álvaro González (footballer, born 1984), Uruguayan football right winger
Álvaro González de Galdeano (born 1970), Spanish cyclist
Álvaro González (Paralympic footballer) (born 1974), Spanish footballer
Álvaro González (footballer, born 1990), Spanish football defender
Álvaro González (politician), Argentine lawyer and politician